Rakvice is a municipality and village in Břeclav District in the South Moravian Region of the Czech Republic. It has about 2,200 inhabitants.

History

The first written mention of Rakvice is from 1248. Before the Thirty Years' War it became a market town, however the war devastated it and it became a village again.

Economy
Rakvice is known for its large vineyards. It lies in the Velkopavlovická wine subregion. The long history of wine producing is symbolized on its coat of arms.

References

External links

 

Villages in Břeclav District